The Great Seal of Canada is a governmental seal used for purposes of state in Canada, being set on letters patent, proclamations and commissions, both to representatives of the monarch and for the appointment of cabinet ministers, senators, and judges. Many other officials, such as officers in the Canadian Armed Forces, receive commissions affixed with the Privy Seal, not the great seal. It is not for sealing up a document as letters close. As a  de facto symbol of Canada the seal is one of the oldest and most honoured instruments of  the Canadian government.

History
The first Great Seal of Canada was carved in the United Kingdom and sent to Canada to replace a temporary seal which had been used since Confederation in 1867.  On the great seal assigned to Canada in 1869, the arms of each of the original provinces—Nova Scotia, New Brunswick, Québec, and Ontario—were shown separately, two on each side of the figure of Queen Victoria seated beneath a canopy.

In view of the intended tour of Canada by George VI in 1939 as King of Canada, the federal parliament passed an act to let the Great Seal of Canada be used for functions that had previously been carried out by the king in London using the Great Seal of the United Kingdom—such as the issuing of an instrument of ratification for an international treaty—but were to be performed by the King while in Canada. This contrasted with the 1931 External Great Seal of the Irish Free State and 1934 Royal Great Seal of South Africa, which also replaced the use of the UK Great Seal on diplomatic documents, but were in each case separate from the pre-existing domestic Great Seal. The 1939 change was described by the tour's official historian as establishing a new official procedure "which asserted and recognized Canada's equality of political status within the British Empire."

Appearance
Dies (seal-making devices) for old seals are destroyed whenever a new monarch takes the throne. The current great seal was designed by artist Eric Aldwinckle and made at the Royal Canadian Mint when Queen Elizabeth II succeeded her father in 1952 and it went into use on 14 November 1955. The seal die is made of specially tempered steel, weighs 3.75 kilograms (8.27 pounds), and is 127 millimetres (5 inches) in diameter. The image depicts the Queen enthroned on the coronation chair and robed, holding the orb and sceptre, and the 1957 version of the Royal Arms of Canada in front. Around the perimeter is inscribed REINE DU CANADA—ELIZABETH II—QUEEN OF CANADA. Previous Great Seals of Canada were inscribed in Latin. While the governor general is the keeper of the Great Seal, the Queen's representative places it in the protection of the Registrar General of Canada. Each of the provinces has its own unique great seal for similar purposes, which is used by the lieutenant governor of the province and kept by the provincial attorney general.

Inscriptions on the Great Seal

Province of Quebec
 George III. SIGILLUM Ÿ PROVINCIÆ Ÿ NOSTRÆ Ÿ QUEBECENSIS Ÿ IN Ÿ AMERICA

Province of Canada
 Victoria. VICTORIA D꞉ G꞉ BRITANIARUM REGINA FID꞉ DEF꞉ SIGILLUM PROVINCIÆ CANADÆ

Canada
 Victoria. VICTORIA DEI GRATIA BRITANNIAR꞉ REGINA F꞉ D꞉ IN CANADA SIGILLUM
 Edward VII. EDWARDUS VII D꞉ G꞉ BRITT ET TERRARUM TRANSMAR QUÆ IN DIT꞉ SUNT BRIT REX F꞉ D꞉ IND꞉ IMP꞉ IN CANADA SIGILLUM 1904
 George V. GEORGIUS V D꞉ G꞉ BRITT ET TERRARUM TRANSMAR QUÆ IN DIT꞉ SUNT BRIT REX F꞉ D꞉ IND꞉ IMP꞉ IN CANADA SIGILLUM 1912
 George VI. GEORGIUS VI D꞉ G꞉ MAG BRIT HIB ET TERR TRANSMAR QUÆ IN DIT꞉ SUNT BRIT REX F꞉ D꞉ IND꞉ IMP꞉ IN CANADA SIGILLUM
 Elizabeth II. REINE DU CANADA • ELIZABETH II • QUEEN OF CANADA

Legal status
Like the Great Seal of the United Kingdom in respect of the Crown in right of that country, the Great Seal of Canada  is the chief seal of the Crown of Canada, and is used to show the Canadian monarch's approval of important state documents. The sovereign acts on the advice of the government of the day. 

The Canadian Great Seal is used not only for administrative purposes, but also ceremonially, when it is put into the custody of a new governor general as part of the customary swearing-in and installation procedure. It is protected under the Security of Information Act, Section 5(2)(e) stating: "Every person who, without lawful authority or excuse, manufactures or sells, or has in his possession for sale, any die, seal or stamp referred to in subsection (1) is guilty of an indictable offence and liable to imprisonment for a term of not more than 14 years or by summary conviction and liable to imprisonment for a term of not more than 12 months or to a fine of not more than $2,000."

See also

 Great Seal (disambiguation)
 Great Seal of Ontario
 Great Seal of Quebec
 National symbols of Canada

References

External links

 Symbols of Canada: The Great Seal of Canada
 Governor General of Canada: The Great Seal of Canada (archived)
 Governor General's Installation (5),  Ceremonial delivery of the Great Seal, at 1.15-2.40 mins

Canada
National symbols of Canada
Monarchy in Canada
Constitution of Canada